Rosita is a 1923 American silent historical comedy drama film directed by Ernst Lubitsch and starring Mary Pickford. The film is based upon an 1872 opera Don César de Bazan of Adolphe d'Ennery and Philippe Dumanoir.

Synopsis
The film takes place in Seville, in a period where the city has sunk into the depths of depravity and sin. Shocked by the depths his people have sunk to, the king of Spain (Holbrook Blinn) decides to give the town a visit when a carnaval is organized in order to redeem it. One of its inhabitants is Rosita (Mary Pickford), a beloved street singer praised by the townspeople for her entertainment.

Rosita is the only source of income to her poor family, who are always fighting each other. She is fed up with living in extreme poverty, while the king is living in wealth. After being forced to pay taxes, Rosita is enraged and comes up with a song in which she insults the king. Soon, the king is informed with the offensive ballad and visits her anonymously. Instead of being angry, he is charmed by the woman. However, the soldiers have come to arrest her for publicly insulting the king.

While being taken to prison, Don Diego (George Walsh) tries to defend her. Instead of convincing the soldiers to set her free, however, he is arrested as well. They fall in love at the police station, but she is unaware Diego is a powerful captain. By the king's request, Rosita is set free and escorted to his castle. Diego, however, is told he will be hung. When she meets him, Rosita doesn't believe he is the king. He tries to seduce her, but she isn't impressed until he offers her fashionable clothes. She doesn't want to have anything to do with him, but is pressured into giving in to his advances by her family, who see an opportunity on becoming wealthy.

Living a luxurious life in the castle, the family still feels disrespected. Rosita's mother (Mathilde Comont) demands for her daughter to have a noble husband, and the king offers her to be married to Diego. Rosita's mother is pleased, not knowing he will be sentenced to death shortly after the wedding. Diego is manipulated into participating by the offer of being shot like a respectable soldier, rather than hanged. At the wedding, they are married with their eyes covered, thus not knowing who they will be married to. The king's plan fails when Rosita breaks the rules and looks at her future husband.

Rosita is shocked to learn her new husband is Diego, who is sent back to jail immediately. Rosita convinces the king to set Diego free. However, when she leaves, the king again orders the guards to kill Diego. Meanwhile, the queen (Irene Rich) has found out about his new fling and is furious.

Soon afterward, Rosita is informed that Diego has been executed. Devastated, she attempts to kill the king until she and the king find out Diego is still alive, and the lovers are reunited. The king leaves his castle to be confronted by his wife about his affair. She reveals she ordered the guards to spare Diego.

Cast

Production
Before this movie, Mary Pickford mostly appeared in features portraying children. Pickford appealed to a fan magazine for new film ideas, and the magazine's contributors wrote back that they wanted to see her play more child roles, such as Cinderella. Pickford thanked them and promptly set out to make a film with an adult role.

In 1922, her studio United Artists was not making any profits despite releasing successful films such as Broken Blossoms, Little Lord Fauntleroy (1921) and Robin Hood (1922). Pickford was desperate to release a film that could perform well and free her of her image as an ingenue.

Realizing Hollywood was making profits with costume movies such as When Knighthood Was in Flower, she decided to make a film based on the 1902 novel Dorothy Vernon of Haddon Hall. She chose Ernst Lubitsch as her director and brought him from Germany in October 1922 to meet with her.

Lubitsch decided he could not make Dorothy Vernon of Haddon Hall. Pickford was annoyed because she had paid $250,000 on its preparations (and eventually filmed the story later). They looked for another story to make a movie, ultimately choosing Faust. However, the project was dropped when Pickford's mother, Charlotte Hennessy, overheard Lubitsch discussing the baby killing scene and immediately nixed the idea. Lubitsch and Pickford eventually decided to film the opera Don César de Bazan, retitling it as Rosita. Lubitsch hesitated about making it, but Pickford convinced him to work on the project.

Pickford wanted Ramón Novarro to co-star opposite her as Don Diego. Rex Ingram, Navarro's mentor, protested this offer by reminding Novarro that Pickford once stated that Novarro's "face and body do not match." Novarro followed Ingram's advice and rejected the role.

Lubitsch later said working with Pickford was a delight. Pickford also enjoyed working with Lubitsch, and at first contracted him to make three more movies with her.

Release
Upon its release, the film was met with success, earning over $1 million.

Preservation
For reasons unknown, Pickford decided the film was a failure. While she carefully preserved most of her filmography, she allowed Rosita to decay, save for the film's fourth reel, and no prints of the film were thought to exist. However, in the 1960s a nitrate print was discovered in the Russian film archives and repatriated by The Museum of Modern Art. A safety preservation negative was made from the nitrate print, but no further work was done on the film. Starting in 2016, work restoring the film began as recent breakthroughs in digital restoration made it possible to reclaim many of the film's severely damaged images. In 2017, the restoration of the film held its world premiere at the 74th Venice International Film Festival.

See also
 Don César de Bazan
 The Spanish Dancer (1923)

References

External links

 
 
 
 
 

1923 films
1923 romantic drama films
American romantic drama films
American silent feature films
American black-and-white films
Films based on operas
Films directed by Ernst Lubitsch
Films set in Spain
Films set in the 17th century
United Artists films
Films based on works by Victor Hugo
1920s historical romance films
American historical romance films
1920s American films
Silent romantic drama films
Silent American drama films
1920s English-language films
Silent historical romance films